This is a list of tribunals believed to be currently in existence in the United Kingdom.

General tribunals

First-tier Tribunal
The First-tier Tribunal hears appeals from regulators and decision-makers in a wide range of subject areas, currently:
 Alternative business structures (licensed conveyancers)
 Charity
 Claims management services
 Consumer credit
 Environmental sanctions
 Estate agents
 Examination boards
 Gambling
 Immigration services
 Freedom of information and data protection
 Local government standards
 Transport
 Asylum support
 Social security and child support
 Criminal injuries compensation
 Care standards
 Mental health
 Special educational needs and disability
 Primary health lists
 Tax
 MPs' expenses
 War pensions and armed forces compensation
 Immigration and asylum

Upper Tribunal
The Upper Tribunal hears appeals from the First-tier Tribunal and also from:
 Independent Safeguarding Authority
 Traffic commissioners
 Financial Services Authority
 Pension Regulator
 Valuation tribunals
 Leasehold valuation tribunals
 Residential property tribunals

Education

School admission appeal panels
School admission appeal panels are set up by local education authorities or school governing bodies to hear appeals against a child's non-admission to their preferred school, or against the school place allotted to them.

School exclusion appeal panels
School exclusion appeal panels are set up by local education authorities or school governing bodies to hear appeals against decisions to exclude a child from school.

Schools adjudicators
Schools adjudicators decide on objections to published admission arrangements for admitting children to schools, and decide on statutory proposals for school organisation.

Employment

Employment tribunals
Employment tribunals hear claims regarding employment including unfair dismissal, redundancy payments and discrimination. They deal with other claims relating to wages and other payments.

Employment Appeal Tribunal
The Employment Appeal Tribunal hears appeals from the employment tribunals.

Police Appeals Tribunal
The Police Appeals Tribunal hears appeals against the findings of internal disciplinary proceedings brought against members of the police force.

Reserve forces appeal tribunals
Reserve forces appeal tribunals hear appeals from members of the United Kingdom reserve forces (the Army Reserve, the Royal Auxiliary Air Force, the Royal Naval Reserve and the Royal Marines Reserve), or their civilian employers, against decisions on exemption from call-out to active service or regarding financial assistance.

Reserve forces reinstatement committees and umpires
Reserve forces reinstatement committees hear applications from members of the United Kingdom reserve forces (the Army Reserve, the Royal Auxiliary Air Force, the Royal Naval Reserve and the Royal Marines Reserve) who consider that they have been refused their right to return to their civilian job following demobilisation. Umpires hear appeals on determinations or orders of the committees.

Finance and commerce

Company Names Tribunal
The Company Names Tribunal makes decisions in disputes about opportunistic company name or limited liability partnership name registrations, when someone registers one or more variations of the name of a well-known company in order to get that company to buy the registration from them.

Competition Appeal Tribunal
The Competition Appeal Tribunal hears appeals against decisions of the Competition Commission, the Office of Fair Trading, Ofcom, Ofgem, Ofwat, the Office of Rail Regulation or the Secretary of State for Business, Innovation and Skills, under the Competition Act 1998 or the Enterprise Act 2002.

Foreign Compensation Commission
The Foreign Compensation Commission assesses the amount of compensation British claimants are entitled to receive under international and British law for losses suffered abroad.

Insolvency Practitioners Tribunal
The Insolvency Practitioners Tribunal heard referrals in respect of the refusal to grant, or the intention to withdraw, a license to act as an insolvency practitioner. Tribunal was abolished by Deregulation Act 2015.

Office of Fair Trading adjudicators
Office of Fair Trading adjudicators hears representations made by consumer credit licence applicants or holders against a notice that the OFT is minded to refuse, revoke or suspend their licence, and also from estate agents who have been notified that the OFT is considering issuing a warning or prohibition order against them.

Health and care

Gender Recognition Panel
The Gender Recognition Panel assesses applications from transgender people for legal recognition of the gender in which they now live.

Medical practitioners tribunals
Medical practitioners tribunals, organised by the Medical Practitioners Tribunal Service, make decision about the fitness to practice of doctors. The MPTS was set up in 2012 to separate the adjudication function of the General Medical Council from its investigatory function.

Misuse of Drugs Tribunal
The Misuse of Drugs Tribunal considers whether there are grounds for prohibiting a health care practitioner from prescribing controlled drugs. The Tribunal has not sat for many years.

National Appeal Panel for Entry to the Pharmaceutical List (Scotland)
The National Appeal Panel considers appeals against decisions taken by Health Boards in Scotland on applications to provide NHS pharmaceutical services.

NHS Litigation Authority Family Health Services Appeal Unit
The NHS Litigation Authority FHS Appeal Unit hears, on behalf of the Secretary of State for Health, appeals from decisions of primary care trusts regarding applications to provide NHS pharmaceutical services in England, and also decides contractual disputes between primary care trusts and general practitioners, dentists or opticians.

NHS Tribunal Scotland
The NHS Tribunal Scotland handles cases referred by Health Boards of fraud and other misconduct by medical, dental, ophthalmic or pharmaceutical practitioners, and considers whether the practitioner should be disqualified from working in the NHS in Scotland.

Primary care trust discipline committees
Primary care trust discipline committees investigate disciplinary matters against various primary health care professionals.

Intellectual property

Comptroller-General of Patents, Designs and Trade Marks
The Comptroller (also known as the Registrar of Trade Marks or Designs) can decide disputes relating to trade marks, patents and registered and unregistered designs.

Controller of Plant Variety Rights
The Controller of Plant Variety Rights considers applications for plant variety rights, and hears representations from others who may be affected by the grant of such rights before making a final decision.

Copyright Tribunal
The Copyright Tribunal decides disputes about the terms and conditions of licences offered by, or licensing schemes operated by, collective licensing bodies in the copyright and related rights area.

Plant Varieties and Seeds Tribunal
The Plant Varieties and Seeds Tribunal hears appeals against decisions of the Controller of Plant Variety Rights regarding plant variety rights, against decisions of the Agriculture Ministers on the listing of new varieties of the main agricultural and vegetable species and seeds certification, and against the decisions of the Forestry Commissioners on matters concerning forest reproduction materials.

Property and land

Adjudicator to HM Land Registry
The Adjudicators to HM Land Registry deal with disputes arising from applications to register, or change the registration of, land in England and Wales.

Agricultural arbitrators
Agricultural arbitrators settle disputes between agricultural landlords and tenants, mostly relating to rent reviews.

Agricultural land tribunals
The agricultural land tribunals deal with issues relating to agricultural tenancies, and drainage disputes between neighbours.

Commons commissioners
Commons commissioners decide disputes about the registration of common land.

Crofters Commission
The Crofters Commission regulates crofting in the Scottish Highlands and Islands.

Forestry committees
Forestry committees deal with appeals against refusals by the Forestry Commissioners to grant a felling licence or the replanting conditions attached to a felling licence, or against a restocking notice or a felling direction served by the Forestry Commissioners.

Leasehold valuation tribunals
Leasehold valuation tribunals decide disputes relating to residential leasehold property, for example the price to be paid when renewing a lease, the tenant's right of first refusal when the landlord sells the property and service charges.

Planning inquiries
The Planning Inspectorate hears appeals against planning decisions by local authorities, and against enforcement action. It also decides appeals on a range of similar matters, such as tree preservation orders or rights of way orders which have been objected to.

Rent assessment committees and rent tribunals
Rent assessment committees and rent tribunals determines disputes about fair and market rents, for examples objections to rents assessed by the Rent Service, establishing an open market rent figure or deciding new rental terms after the end of an assured tenancy or assured shorthold tenancy.

Residential property tribunals
Residential property tribunals deal with appeals against the refusal by a local housing authority or housing association to allow a tenant to buy their home on the grounds that the property is particularly suitable for occupation by elderly persons, applications for and appeals against empty dwelling management orders, and appeals against various other types of housing orders and notices.

Valuation tribunals
The Valuation Tribunal for England and the Valuation Tribunal for Wales hear appeals concerning Council Tax, non-domestic rates and land drainage rates.

Pensions

Board of the Pension Protection Fund 
The Board of the Pension Protection Fund considers applications for compensation to occupational pension schemes, with insolvent employers, that suffer a loss that can be attributable to an offence involving fraud or dishonesty.

Pensions Ombudsman and Pension Protection Fund Ombudsman
The Pensions Ombudsman makes binding determinations on complaints concerning occupational and personal pension schemes.

The Pension Protection Fund Ombudsman can review certain decisions of the Pension Protection Fund and also deals with appeals from decisions of the Financial Assistance Scheme.

Pensions Regulator
The Determinations Panel of the Pensions Regulator decides whether to impose sanctions where an investigation has identified breaches of the law or codes of practice relating to pensions, and also considers applications for the Pensions Regulator to use its powers.

Police and fire fighters pensions appeals tribunals
The Police Pensions Appeals Tribunal hears appeals against decisions of police authorities to refuse to grant a pension, or to grant a smaller pension than is claimed.

The Fire Fighters Pensions Appeals Tribunal performs a similar role.

Transport

Aircraft and Shipbuilding Industries Arbitration Tribunal
The Aircraft and Shipbuilding Industries Arbitration Tribunal was established to hear appeals over the valuation of shares to compensate individual operators following the nationalisation of the UK aerospace and shipbuilding industries in the late 1970s. It was abolished in March 2013.

Civil Aviation Authority
Panels of members of the Civil Aviation Authority hear appeals regarding refusals to grant, or variations or revocations of, an aerodrome licence, an air operator's certificate, an air traffic controller's licence, approval for a person to provide an air traffic control service, a certificate of airworthiness or a permit to fly, approval of equipment for use on board an aircraft or in the provision of an air traffic control service, a maintenance engineer's licence and a pilot's licence.

Traffic

London Tribunals (parking adjudicators)
Formerly named Parking and Traffic Appeals Service. Parking adjudicators hear parking appeals against fixed penalty notices issued for parking, bus lane and various traffic sign contraventions within Greater London.

Road User Charging Adjudicator Tribunal
Road User Charging Adjudicators hear appeals against congestion charging and low emission zone penalties in Greater London.

Traffic commissioners
The traffic commissioners license operators of heavy goods vehicles and public service vehicles (buses), grant vocational licences to drivers of such vehicles, and register local bus services; they also take action against operators and drivers where the required standards are not met, and can fine bus companies where services do not run on time.

Traffic Penalty Tribunal (including Bus Lane Adjudicators)
The Traffic Penalty Tribunal decides appeals against parking and bus lane penalties issued in England (outside London) and Wales. It was created by statutory instrument to fulfil provisions of the Traffic Management Act 2004, it is partly responsible to the PATROL joint committee, a collection of local authorities responsible for enforcing PCNs who make use of the traffic penalty tribunals adjudication process.

Decisions of the Traffic Penalty Tribunal can be challenged by judicial review. The appeal process is governed by the Civil Enforcement of Parking Contraventions (England) Representations and Appeals Regulations 2007 and The Civil Enforcement of Parking Contraventions (England) General Regulations 2007.

The tribunal handles roughly 25000 cases per year, the vast majority of appeals are handled virtually

Other

Children's Hearings (Scotland)
Children's Hearings took over, from the Scottish courts, most of the responsibility for dealing with children and young people under 16, and in some cases under 18, who commit offences or who are in need of care and protection

Horserace Betting Levy Appeal Tribunal

The Horserace Betting Levy Appeal Tribunal hear appeals against the amount of levy collected by the Horserace Betting Levy Board to be used in the improvement of horseracing and breeds of horses, and for the advancement of veterinary science and education.

London Buildings Acts tribunals

Information Commissioner
The Information Commissioner considers complaints that organisations may have breached data protection laws, or that public authorities have not complied with the law on freedom of information. It also considers complaints made under the Privacy and Electronic Communications Regulations 2003.

Investigatory Powers Tribunal
The Investigatory Powers Tribunal hears complaints about surveillance carried out by a public body under the Regulation of Investigatory Powers Act, including any alleged conduct by or on behalf of the Security Service (MI5), the Secret Intelligence Service (MI6) and the Government Communications Headquarters (GCHQ).

Proscribed Organisations Appeal Commission
The Proscribed Organisations Appeal Commission deals with appeals in cases where the Home Secretary has decided not to de-proscribe organisations (remove their status as illegal organisations) believed to be involved in terrorism.

Scottish Charities Appeal Panel
The Scottish Charities Appeal Panel hears appeals against decisions of the Office of the Scottish Charity Regulator.

Solicitors Disciplinary Tribunal
The Solicitors Disciplinary Tribunal adjudicates upon alleged breaches, by solicitors, of rules or their code of professional conduct. Cases are prosecuted by the Solicitors Regulation Authority.

Welsh Language Tribunal 
The Welsh Language Tribunal's function is to deal with appeals against decisions by the Welsh Language Commissioner in relation to Welsh Language Standards.

Tribunals which have never sat

Antarctic Act Tribunal
The Antarctic Act Tribunal would consider any appeal against the Secretary of State in cases where permits for a British expedition to enter or remain in Antarctica, granted under the Antarctic Act 1994, have been revoked or suspended.

Chemical Weapons Licensing Appeal Tribunal
The Chemical Weapons Licensing Appeal Tribunal would consider any appeal against the Secretary of State where a licence to produce, use or have possession of toxic chemicals or precursors under the Chemicals Weapons Act 1996 has been refused, revoked or varied.

Conveyancing appeal tribunals
Conveyancing appeal tribunals hear appeals against decisions of the Authorised Conveyancing Practitioners Board, set up to regulate the conveyancing industry. However the board was never formally established, and the tribunal has therefore never sat.

Industrial Arbitration Tribunal
The Industrial Arbitration Tribunal decides disputes arising from vesting and compensation orders which the Secretary of State has the power under the Industry Act 1975 to issue in regard to the transfer of control of important manufacturing undertakings to non-residents. These powers have never been exercised.

Justices and Clerks Indeminification Tribunal
The Justices and Clerks Indeminification Tribunal would hear appeals by magistrates and clerks from decisions of magistrates' courts committees regarding indemnification against costs incurred in disputing any claims made against them.

Mines and Quarries Tribunal
The Mines and Quarries Tribunal would enquire into the competence of a person to continue to hold a certificate in regard to the performance of duties relating to mines and quarries. The tribunal has never been convened.

Sea Fish Licence Tribunal
The Sea Fish Licence Tribunal would have heard appeals from individual fishermen against their "days at sea" allocations in their licence, under the Sea Fish (Conservation) Act 1967. However the "days at sea" programme envisaged by the Act was never commenced and the tribunal has never been convened.

References

Lists of organisations based in the United Kingdom
 
United Kingdom administrative law
Trib